Achryson quadrimaculatum is a species of longhorn beetle in the Cerambycinae subfamily. It was described by Johan Christian Fabricius in 1792. It is known from Costa Rica, Guadeloupe, Trinidad, Guyana, Aruba, Brazil, Argentina, and Venezuela.

References

Achrysonini
Beetles described in 1792
Taxa named by Johan Christian Fabricius